Peter Joseph Babando (May 10, 1925 – February 19, 2020) was an American-born Canadian ice hockey player who played in the National Hockey League with all four of the United States-based Original Six teams (Boston Bruins, Detroit Red Wings, Chicago Black Hawks and New York Rangers).

The son of Italian immigrants, Babando was born in Braeburn-Lower Burrell, Pennsylvania. His family briefly moved back to Italy before settling in South Porcupine, Ontario, when he was a youngster.

Babando died on February 19, 2020, at the age of 94.

Career 
During six NHL seasons, Babando scored 86 goals, 73 assists (for 159 points) in 351 regular season games. On April 23, 1950, in Game 7 of the Stanley Cup Finals, he scored the Cup-clinching goal as a member of the Red Wings, to defeat the New York Rangers at 8:31 of the second overtime. As of 2022, it remains the only Game 7 of the Stanley Cup Finals to go multiple overtimes. At the time, he was one of the few American-born players in the NHL. The goal was the third and final Stanley Cup playoff goal in Babando's career.  About three months later, Babando was traded to the Chicago Black Hawks as part of a nine-player deal. Babando was also a member of the Clinton Comets of the Eastern Hockey League.

Career statistics

References

External links

Picture of Pete Babando's Name on the 1950 Stanley Cup Plaque
Sports Heros (Timmins)

1925 births
2020 deaths
American men's ice hockey left wingers
Boston Bruins players
Boston Olympics players
Canadian ice hockey left wingers
Chicago Blackhawks players
Clinton Comets players
Detroit Red Wings players
Ice hockey people from Ontario
Ice hockey players from Pennsylvania
New York Rangers players
People from Westmoreland County, Pennsylvania
Sportspeople from Timmins
Stanley Cup champions
Canadian expatriate ice hockey players in the United States